Bent Flyvbjerg is a Danish economic geographer. He was the First BT Professor and Inaugural Chair of Major Programme Management at Oxford University's Saïd Business School (retiring from the post in 2021) and is the Villum Kann Rasmussen Professor and Chair of Major Program Management at the IT University of Copenhagen. He was previously Professor of Planning at Aalborg University, Denmark and Chair of Infrastructure Policy and Planning at Delft University of Technology, The Netherlands.  He is a fellow of St Anne's College, Oxford.

Academic work 
Flyvbjerg is the author or editor of 10 books and more than 200 papers in professional journals and edited volumes. His publications have been translated into 20 languages. He is a frequent commentator in the media.

Flyvbjerg received his Ph.D. in urban geography and planning from Aarhus University, Denmark, with parts done at the University of California at Los Angeles. He has written extensively about megaprojects, decision making, city management, and philosophy of social science. He was a member of the Danish Infrastructure Commission and a director of the Danish Court Administration.

His research falls in three main areas: (a) The philosophy and methodology of the social sciences, (b) Power and rationality in decision making, and (c) Megaproject planning and management.

Philosophy and methodology of the social sciences 
Flyvbjerg's main contribution is developing the theory and methodology of phronetic social science, i.e., a social science based on Aristotelian phronesis. Flyvbjerg argues that social sciences that attempt to emulate natural science and predictive theory have failed, and will continue to fail. He further argues that in order to matter the social sciences must inform practical reason instead of abstract rationality. This is best done by a focus on values and power in actual human decision making, according to Flyvbjerg. He develops the methodological guidelines for such research and demonstrates how to employ them in concrete case studies in phronetic social science.

Phronetic research is aimed at being directly relevant to society and people, including ordinary citizens and policy makers. In terms of philosophy and history of science, Flyvbjerg is influenced by Aristotle rather than by Socrates and Plato. Key works  are the books Making Social Science Matter: Why Social Inquiry Fails and How It Can Succeed Again and Real Social Science: Applied Phronesis (with Sanford Schram and Todd Landman), both published by Cambridge University Press, plus a number of research papers.

Flyvbjerg's work has been extensively debated in the social sciences, most prominently in the so-called "Flyvbjerg Debate" covered in the book Making Political Science Matter: Debating Knowledge, Research, and Method, edited by Sanford Schram and Brian Caterino.

Power and rationality in decision making 
In his research on power and rationality, Flyvbjerg has documented how power influences rationality, and vice versa. Flyvbjerg here shows that in human decision making what is called rationality often turns out to be rationalization, under the influence of power. He offers a number of propositions about power and rationality, among which:

 Power defines reality;
 Rationality is context-dependent; the context of rationality is power;
 Rationalization presented as rationality is a principal strategy in the exercise of power;
 The greater the power, the less the rationality;
 Power has a rationality that rationality does not know.

Flyvbjerg applies phronetic social science to research on power and rationality. Theoretically and methodologically, the main influences on Flyvbjerg's work on power and rationality are Thucydides, Machiavelli, and Nietzsche. Flyvbjerg specifically highlights Machiavelli's power studies in Florence as a source of influence for the choice of in-depth case studies as the means for understanding the dynamics of power and how power enables and constrains rationality and rational government.

The main works on power and rationality are the book Rationality and Power: Democracy in Practice, published by the University of Chicago Press, plus a number of research papers.

Megaproject planning and management 
Flyvbjerg's research on megaproject planning and management compares plans with actual outcomes, and explains discrepancies. Flyvbjerg documents what he calls The Iron Law of Megaprojects: "Over time, over budget, under benefits, over and over again." This is a statistical, not a deterministic, law. Megaprojects that are on time, budget, and benefits do exist, but they are rare, according to the data. The Iron Law applies at an overwhelmingly high level of statistical significance. Flyvbjerg shows that a root cause is that competition between megaprojects and their sponsors creates biases rooted in political and organizational pressures that lead to the consistent overestimating of project benefits and the underestimating of project costs. The best megaprojects do not get implemented, but rather the ones that look best on paper. Flyvbjerg argues that the ones that look best on paper are the ones for which costs and benefits have been misrepresented the most, either deliberately through strategic misrepresentation (political bias), or non-deliberately through optimism bias (psychological bias) or, typically, through a combination of both.

He identifies three antidotes to the Iron Law: (a) Realistic planning, including de-biasing of all cost, schedule, and benefit estimates; (b) High-quality delivery teams; and (c) Governance structures with incentives for realistic plans and for delivering those plans to time, budget, and benefits; and with early-warning-sign systems to immediately capture and act on things that go wrong, which they invariably do in megaprojects, due to their sheer size and complexity, according to Flyvbjerg. Based on Daniel Kahneman's work on the planning fallacy and optimism bias, Flyvbjerg pioneered reference class forecasting as a practical method for de-biasing megaproject plans.

In his book, Thinking, Fast and Slow, Kahneman calls Flyvbjerg's insights on the planning fallacy and reference class forecasting, "the single most important piece of advice regarding how to increase accuracy in forecasting." Kahneman is a key intellectual influence for Flyvbjerg's work on megaprojects, as is Nassim Nicholas Taleb, especially his work on black swans, and Martin Wachs, who was Flyvbjerg's doctoral supervisor at UCLA.

Flyvbjerg's key works on megaproject planning and management are the books Megaprojects and Risk: An Anatomy of Ambition (with Nils Bruzelius and Werner Rothengatter), The Oxford Handbook of Megaproject Management, Decision-Making On Mega-Projects: Cost–benefit Analysis, Planning, and Innovation (with Hugo Priemus and Bert van Wee), and Megaproject Planning and Management: Essential Readings, plus a number of research papers. Flyvbjerg has argued that his work on megaprojects constitutes an example of phronetic social science (see above).

"Underestimating Costs in Public Works Projects: Error or Lie?" Principal author: Bent Flyvbjerg; co-authors: Mette K. Skamris Holm and Søren L. Buhl. Journal of the American Planning Association , vol. 68, no. 3, Summer 2002, pp. 279–295.
The main findings from the study reported in the reports-all highly significant and most likely conservative-are as follows:
•	In 86% of transportation infrastructure projects, costs are underestimated.
•	For all project types, actual costs are on average 28% higher than estimated costs (sd=39).
•	Overestimates are rare and small (very rarely over 20%) 
•	Underestimates are much larger (more than 30% are over by 40+%). 
•	Cost underestimation cannot be explained by error and seems to be best explained by strategic misrepresentation, i.e., lying.
•	Estimates have not improved at all in 70 years.
•	Martin Wachs reports being told over and over of pressure to cook numbers.
•	This seems to be a problem particularly when the responsible agency is not private and is not a public agency with transparency and accountability (e.g., special purpose agencies).
•	They did not find any significant difference between public and private agencies in how good their cost projections were.
•	They also found that projects that get approval seem to be those that underestimate costs, understate environmental harm and overstate funding and economic benefits and transit ridership.

Books
1998 Rationality and Power: Democracy in Practice, University of Chicago Press
2001 Making Social Science Matter: Why Social Inquiry Fails and How It Can Succeed Again, Cambridge University Press
2003 Megaprojects and Risk: An Anatomy of Ambition. Cambridge University Press
2008 Decision-Making on Mega-Projects: Cost-Benefit Analysis, Planning and Innovation, Elgar
2012 Real Social Science: Applied Phronesis, Cambridge University Press
2014 Megaproject Planning and Management: Essential Readings, Volumes I-II, Elgar
2017 The Oxford Handbook of Megaproject Management, Oxford University Press

Awards
 Knighthood of the Order of the Dannebrog (Denmark, 2002)
 Fulbright Scholarship (twice)
 Project Management Institute Research Achievement Award (2019)
 Honorary doctorate, IT-University of Copenhagen (2020)

References

Danish urban planners
Academic staff of the Delft University of Technology
Danish geographers
Statutory Professors of the University of Oxford
Dutch urban planners
Living people
Philosophers of social science
Academics of Saïd Business School
People associated with Aalborg University
1952 births